Colin Lovitt was a Queen's Counsel in Australia. He was known for defending Greg Domaszewicz and for getting in trouble for calling magistrate Bruce Zahner a 'cretin'. He represented Sudo Cavkic, charged with the murder of Keith William Allan, at the long-running second trial in 2006 that resulted in a hung jury, and at the similarly long third trial in 2007 when Cavkic was convicted.

Colin Lovitt died 10 January 2021.

References

External links 
 George Negus Tonight interview
 Police consider civil action on Matt Butcher verdict Colin Lovitt gets offending family off

Lawyers from Melbourne
Australian barristers
Australian King's Counsel
20th-century King's Counsel
Melbourne Law School alumni

2021 deaths
Year of birth missing